My Daughter, Geum Sa-wol is a 2015 South Korean television series starring Baek Jin-hee, Park Se-young, Jeon In-hwa, Yoon Hyun-min, and Do Sang-woo. It aired on MBC on Saturdays and Sundays 21:45 for 51 episodes from September 5, 2015 until February 28, 2016. Although the drama enjoyed high viewership ratings, with the finale earning national viewership of 33.6%, critics described the drama as "absurdly unrealistic".

Plot 
Sa-wol, Hye-sang and Oh-wol grow up in the same orphanage as best friends. On the day the orphanage collapses, Hye-sang finds out that Sa-wol is to be adopted by her wealthy biological father instead of her after a DNA test that reveals the mixed up between them. Eager to be raised in the upper class society, Hye-sang traps the orphanage director, who is also her true father, in the collapsing building with Oh-wol to hide the truth. However, when Sa-wol ended up being brought into the family as well, Hye-sang starts tormenting, blame shifting and burying the truth, to make herself the better daughter. As the story goes, her web of lies gets bigger and bigger and becomes harder to control.

Cast
Baek Jin-hee as Geum Sa-wol
Kal So-won as young Sa-wol 
Park Se-young as Oh Hye-sang
Lee Na-yoon as young Hye-sang
Yoon Hyun-min as Kang Chan-bin
Jeon Jin-seo as young Chan-bin
Jeon In-hwa as Shin Deuk-ye
Do Sang-woo as Joo Se-hoon
Go Woo-rim as child Se-hoon
Goo Seung-hyun as young Se-hoon
Ahn Nae-sang as Joo Ki-hwang 
Song Ha-yoon as Lee Hong-do/Joo Oh-wol
Son Chang-min as Kang Man-hoo 
Park Sang-won as Oh Min-ho 
Do Ji-won as Han Ji-hye
Kim Hee-jung as Choi Ma-ri
Park Won-sook as So Kook-ja
Lee Yeon-doo as Kang Dal-rae
Kwak Ji-hye as child Dal-rae
Kim Go-eun as young Dal-rae
Kang Rae-yeon as Kang Jjil-rae
Kim So-eun as child Jjil-rae
Park Soo-bin as young Jjil-rae
Choi Dae-chul as Im Shi-ro
Jung Yoon-seok as young Shi-ro
Kim Bo-yoon as young Kang Dal-rae	
Yoon Bok-in as Yoo Kwon-soon
Kim Ji-young as Im Mi-rang
Lee Tae-woo as Im Woo-rang
Lee Jung-gil as Shin Ji-sang
Oh Mi-yeon as Kim Hye-soon (Cameo)
Kim Ho-jin as Geum Hyung-sik (Cameo)
Kim Ji-ho as Kim Ji-young (Cameo)
Yoo Jae-suk as himself (Cameo)
Lee Dong-ha as Hye-sang's lawyer in charge

Ratings

Note: episode 41 wasn't aired on Saturday January 23 due to broadcast of the football Asian Olympic qualification match between South Korea and Jordan. This episode was aired on Sunday January 24, 2016.

Awards and nominations

References

2015 South Korean television series debuts
2016 South Korean television series endings
MBC TV television dramas
Korean-language television shows
South Korean melodrama television series
Television shows written by Kim Soon-ok